Ban Phai station is a railway station located in Nai Mueang Subdistrict, Ban Phai District, Khon Kaen. It was originally a ground-level station and it was refurbished and reopened as an elevated station on 14 February 2019.

Train services 
 Special Express (Isan Mankha) No. 25/26 Bangkok–Nong Khai–Bangkok
 Express No. 69/70 Bangkok–Nong Khai–Bangkok
 Express No. 75/76 Bangkok–Nong Khai–Bangkok
 Express No. 77/78 Bangkok–Nong Khai–Bangkok
 Rapid No. 133/134 Bangkok–Nong Khai–Bangkok
 Local No. 415/418 Nakhon Ratchasima–Nong Khai–Nakhon Ratchasima
 Local No. 416/417 Udon Thani–Nakhon Ratchasima–Udon Thani
 Local No. 431/432 Kaeng Khoi Junction–Khon Kaen–Kaeng Khoi Junction (via Nakhon Ratchasima)

References 

 
 

Railway stations in Thailand